School for the Gifted may refer to the following schools:

 School for the Gifted (Gwagwalada), a secondary school in Gwagwalada, Abuja, Nigeria
 Pine View School for the Gifted, Osprey, Florida, a public school (elementary to high school levels)
 Long Island School for the Gifted, Huntington Station, New York, a private school (pre-kindergarten to 9th grade)
 Lincoln School for the Gifted, a school for gifted but disadvantaged children from 1966 to 1970 on the campus of Lincoln Institute (Kentucky), Shelby County, Kentucky

See also 
 High School for Gifted Students, Hanoi University of Science, Hanoi, Vietnam
 High School for the Gifted, Ho Chi Minh City, Vietnam, a public high school
 Trần Đại Nghĩa High School for the Gifted, Ho Chi Minh City, Vietnam, a public high school
 Ben Tre High School for the Gifted, Ben Tre, Vietnam, a public high school
 Quốc Học – Huế High School for the Gifted, Thừa Thiên–Huế, Vietnam, a high school
 School for the Talented and Gifted, Dallas, Texas, a public secondary school
 Arkansas Governor's School, also known as Arkansas Governor's School for the Gifted and Talented, a six-week residential program for high school seniors
 Philippa Schuyler Middle School for the Gifted and Talented, New York City, New York